AS9000, Aerospace Basic Quality System Standard, was developed by a group of US aerospace prime contractors, including Allied-Signal. Allison Engine Company, Boeing, General Electric Aircraft Engines, Lockheed Martin, McDonnell Douglas, Northrop Grumman, Pratt Whitney, Rockwell Collins, Sikorsky Aircraft, Smartronix, and Hamilton Sundstrand.  Significantly, the US government was not actively involved in the AS9000 standard's development.  AS9000 was developed and issued under the auspices of the Society of Automotive Engineers.

The intent and concept behind AS9000 are similar to Boeing's D1-9000.  The standard is based in ISO 9000, with 27 additional requirements unique to the aerospace industry.  The intent is to standardize and streamline many of the other aerospace quality management standards.

See also
 AS9100

References 

Aviation standards
Quality control